Dozier is a surname. Notable people with the surname include:

Brian Dozier (born 1987), baseball player
D. J. Dozier (born 1965), American baseball and football player
Edward Dozier (1916–1971), Pueblo Native American anthropologist and linguist
Gil Dozier (1934–2013), Louisiana politician
Henrietta Cuttino Dozier (1872–1947), American architect
Hunter Dozier (born 1991), baseball player
James L. Dozier (born 1931), US Army general
James C. Dozier (1885–1974), Medal of Honor Recipient
Kimberly Dozier (born 1966), CBS News correspondent
Lamont Dozier (1941—2022), American musician
P. J. Dozier (born 1996), American basketball player
Robert Dozier (born 1985), American basketball player
Scott Dozier (1970–2019), American convicted murderer
William Dozier (1908–1991), American film and television producer
Holland-Dozier-Holland, songwriting trio that included Lamont Dozier
Ronnie Dozier (born 1987), American Recording Artist

See also
Dozier Farm, historical house in Nashville, Tennessee, USA.
Florida School for Boys, also known as the Arthur G. Dozier School for Boys, a youth reform school in Florida shut down in 2011 after a notorious history of abuse